Pietà or Pietà with Mary Magdalene is a 1529 painting by Bronzino, produced early in his career and now in the Uffizi in Florence.

References

Bronzino
Paintings depicting Mary Magdalene
Paintings by Bronzino
Paintings in the collection of the Uffizi
1529 paintings